HMAS Marguerite was an  sloop laid down for the Royal Navy by Dunlop Bremner & Company at Port Glasgow in Scotland in July 1915 and launched on 23 November 1915.
She was transferred to Australia in 1919 and commissioned into the Royal Australian Navy on 17 January 1920, as HMAS Marguerite. After being paid off on 23 July 1929 she was sunk as a target on 1 August 1935.

References

External links
 Clyde-built Ships Database

Arabis-class sloops of the Royal Australian Navy
1915 ships
Ships sunk as targets
Ships built on the River Clyde
Maritime incidents in 1935
Scuttled vessels of New South Wales